The attack on Fatima's house refers to a disputed violent attack on the house of Fatima, daughter of the Islamic prophet Muhammad. The attack allegedly took place shortly after the death of Muhammad in 11 AH (632 CE) and was instigated by his successor Abu Bakr and led by Umar, another companion. The purpose of the attack was to arrest Fatima's husband Ali, who had withheld his pledge of allegiance. It is alleged that her injuries during the raid directly caused the young Fatima's miscarriage and death within six months of Muhammad.

The above allegations are brought forward by the Shia and categorically rejected by the Sunni, the two largest branches of Islam. On the one hand, Shia historians list some early Sunni sources that corroborate these allegations, and point out that sensitive information about the incident has been censored by Sunni scholars who were concerned with the righteous presentation of companions. On the other hand, it is unimaginable for Sunnis that the companions would engage in violence against Muhammad's family. In turn, Sunni Islam holds that Fatima died from grief after Muhammad's death and that her child died in infancy of natural causes.

Following her will, Abu Bakr was excluded from the private funeral of Fatima, and she was buried secretly at night. Fatima has been compared to Mary, the mother of Jesus, especially in Shia Islam. In view of Fatima's place in Islam, these allegations are highly controversial, with beliefs primarily split along sectarian lines between Sunni and Shia denominations.

Historical background

Saqifa 
In the immediate aftermath of Muhammad's death in 11/632, the Ansar (Medinan Muslims) gathered at the Saqifa of the Banu Sa'ida clan. The conventional wisdom is that they met to decide on a new leader for the Muslim community among themselves. For Madelung, however, the absence of the Muhajirun (Meccan Muslims) from this meeting suggests that the Ansar gathered to re-establish their control over their city Medina, under the belief that the Muhajirun would mostly return to Mecca after Muhammad's death. Abu Bakr and Umar, both companions of Muhammad, were tipped off about the meeting and arrived there with Abu Ubaida, as the only representatives of the Muhajirun. After a heated session, in which a chief of the Ansar was beaten into submission by Umar, those gathered at the Saqifa agreed on Abu Bakr as the new head of the community.

Opposition to Abu Bakr 
The Saqifa affair excluded Muhammad's family, who were preparing to bury him, and most of the Muhajirun. Some of them opposed Abu Bakr, and the Sunni al-Baladhuri reports that the Banu Hashim (Muhammad's clan) and some of his companions gathered at Fatima's house in protest. Among them were Muhammad's uncle Abbas and his companion Zubayr, according to Madelung. The protesters, including Fatima, held that her husband Ali was the rightful successor to Muhammad, possibly referring to Muhammad's announcement at the Ghadir Khumm. Ali is said to have explained this position to Abu Bakr, or to his representatives. Ali and Fatima are also said to have visited the Ansar at their homes and appealed for their support.

Threats against Ali 
Soon after the Saqifa meeting, Abu Bakr reportedly tasked his ally Umar with securing Ali's pledge of allegiance. As related by the Sunni al-Tabari, the latter led an armed mob to Ali's residence and threatened to set the house on fire if Ali and his supporters would not pay their allegiance to Abu Bakr. Here, al-Tabari writes that Umar shouted, "By God, either you come out to render the oath of allegiance [to Abu Bakr], or I will set the house on fire." The scene soon grew violent, and Zubayr was disarmed and carried away. According to al-Tabari, Zubayr had come out of the house with his sword drawn but tripped on something and was then attacked. 

The mob retreated without Ali's pledge after Fatima pleaded with them, as related in the Sunni al-Imama wa al-siyasa, and by the proto-Shia al-Ya'qubi, though Fatima is absent in the account of the Sunni al-Tabari. Alternatively, al-Baladhuri states that Ali capitulated and pledged allegiance to Abu Bakr immediately after Umar's threat. In contrast, the canonical Sahih al-Bukhari and Sahih Muslim relate that Ali pledged to Abu Bakr after Fatima died some time later. Soufi comments that none except one of the traditions cited by al-Tabari and al-Baladhuri has a chain of transmission that reaches back to the time of the conflict.

Boycott of Ali 
Madelung believes that Abu Bakr later placed a boycott on Ali and also on the Banu Hashim to abandon their support for Ali. As a result, prominent men ceased to speak to Ali, according to a Sunni hadith attributed to Aisha. Hazleton similarly writes that Ali prayed alone even in the mosque. Jafri adds that those who initially supported Ali gradually turned away and pledged their allegiance to Abu Bakr. It appears that only his wife Fatima and their four young children remained on his side, writes Hazleton, in line with a statement to this effect attributed to Ali in Nahj al-balagha. At the same time, Ali had already turned down proposals to forcefully pursue the caliphate, including an offer from Abu Sufyan, which led Veccia Vaglieri to conclude that Ali had no interest in the caliphate. In contrast, Momen, Jafri, and Ayoub suggest that Ali rejected these divisive offers, fearing the destruction of the nascent Islam. Momen adds that any remaining support for the caliphate of Ali melted away as he refused to advance his claims.

Umar's reputation 
Umar has been noted for his severity and misogyny, especially in Shia sources. "Umar's toughness" is cited in a Sunni tradition by Aisha as the reason Umar was excluded from a supposed attempt at reconciliation between Ali and Abu Bakr. Kelen describes an incident of Umar's violence against his sister when she professed Islam before Umar. According to Madelung, Umar's reputation for "harsh treatment of women" was why Umm Kulthum bint Ali resisted his marriage proposal.

Shia narrative 
 
It is uncertain what followed the above altercation at Fatima's house. Some canonical Shia sources claim that Fatima later suffered broken ribs during a raid on her house led by Umar. Such sources add that the pregnant Fatima also miscarried her son Muhsin, whose name had been chosen by Muhammad before his death, according to Abbas.

Kitab Sulaym ibn Qays

Authenticity of the book 
Perhaps the earliest and most detailed Shia account of Umar's raid appears in the Kitab Sulaym ibn Qays. The attribution of this collection of Shia hadiths to Sulaym, who might have been a close companion of Ali, is often rejected by Sunnis. On the other hand, when asked about it, the fifth Imam, Muhammad al-Baqir, is said to have confirmed the authenticity of the book. Nevertheless, there is no consensus among Shia theologians about the reliability of the whole book. After analyzing the text, Modarresi is of the view that the core of the text has been preserved and dates back to before 138 AH, while some parts of the book might be more recent, such as its prediction of black banners arriving from the East before the collapse of the Umayyads. At the same time, such instances of anachronism have been viewed by the Shia as prophesies on the part of the prophet and the Shia Imams, notes Khetia.

Attack 
Much of the post-Saqifa account in the Kitab Sulaym ibn Qays is similar to (Sunni) historical sources, but the book also contains explicit details of an alleged raid led by an impatient Umar on Fatima's house after multiple failed attempts to subdue Ali. The account is narrated on the authority of Salman, a close companion of both the prophet and Ali. In the final standoff, according to this account, Fatima refused the mob entry into the house, after which an enraged Umar ignored Fatima's pleas and set the door on fire, pushing his way into the house. Upon Fatima's resistance, the account describes that Umar physically assaulted her with a sheathed sword. The mob soon overpowered Ali and dragged him away, striking Fatima again as she tried to prevent it. The account states that Fatima still carried the bruises from this raid when she died soon after.

Soufi notes that a slightly different version of the book also contains a reference to Fatima's miscarriage, while another condensed version only mentions Umar's role in the event. In all versions, it is Ali or Fatima who argue with Abu Bakr and Umar about the rights of the Ahl al-Bayt.

Kitab al-Kafi 
Kitab al-Kafi is a canonical collection of Twelver hadiths compiled by al-Kulayni. The book contains a tradition ascribed to the seventh Imam, Musa al-Kazim, which describes Fatima as a (female) martyr. This hadith is narrated on the authority of a brother of al-Kazim with the name of Ali ibn Ja'far al-Sadiq, who is regarded as a prolific and trustworthy narrator and a mainstream Shia. As a result, this tradition is viewed as authoritative and authentic in Twelver scholarly circles.

Kamil al-ziyarat 
Kamil al-ziyarat was compiled by al-Qummi, a distinguished Twelver traditionist. The book includes a hadith ascribed to the sixth Imam, Ja'far al-Sadiq, in which the prophet was informed during the Isra about the violent deaths of his family at the hands of Muslims. For his daughter Fatima, the report mentions her miscarriage and death because of her injuries during a raid on her house. This tradition is reported on the authority of Hammad ibn Uthman, a well-known companion of al-Sadiq and a mainstream Shia. As a result, this tradition is again viewed as authentic in Twelver hadith circles. 

According to Khetia, this book contains the earliest reference to Fatima's miscarriage during Umar's raid. Alternatively, Soufi notes that a slightly different version of the Kitab Sulaym ibn Qays already refers to Fatima's miscarriage during the attack. Aside from these works, multiple sources record a fifth child of Fatima, named Muhsin, though Sunni sources maintain that he died in infancy.

Tarikh al-Ya'qubi 
Al-Ya'qubi describes a raid on Fatima's house led by Abu Bakr and Umar, writing that Ali came out with a sword but was overpowered. The mob then entered the house but left after Fatima threatened to cry to God for help. He also cites Abu Bakr's regret on his deathbed for breaking into Fatima's house. Al-Ya'qubi lists Muhsin among the children of Fatima without alluding to miscarriage.

Kitab al-Irshad 
This work was compiled by al-Mufid, another prominent Twelver theologian. Therein, al-Mufid only mentions the Shia belief in the miscarriage of Muhsin without referring to Umar or listing any traditions to support this belief. Considering that al-Mufid writes about violence against Fatima elsewhere, Khetia suspects that he refrained in his Kitab al-Irshad from controversial topics to render the book accessible to most Twelvers without provoking the anger of Sunnis.

Dala'il al-imama 
In his Dala'il al-imama, Ibn Rustam (4/11 century) includes a tradition from Ja'far al-Sadiq on the authority of Abu Basir, a prolific transmitter of hadith and a close companion of the sixth Imam. The rest of the chain of transmission includes some of the most prominent Shia authorities, and this hadith is thus viewed as reliable. The content of the hadith is very similar to the account found in the Kitab Sulaym ibn Qays, except that it adds that Fatima lost Muhsin when she was struck by a client of Umar, named Qunfudh, rather than Umar himself.

Al-Ama'li aw al-majalis 
The influential Ibn Babawayh narrates in his book a long hadith, attributed to Muhammad, in which he predicts the plight of Fatima after his death, "her sanctity shall be violated, her rights usurped, her inheritance denied and her troubles multiplied. She shall lose her child [through miscarriage], all the while crying out, 'O my Muhammad,' but no one will come to her aid." The hadith adds that she would be consoled by Mary in her final illness, that she would meet her father after her death "heavy with grief, persecuted and martyred," and that Muhammad would pray to God to punish those who wronged her.

Sunni narrative 

The allegations of violence are categorically rejected by Sunnis, who also maintain that Muhsin died in infancy of natural causes. Nevertheless, these allegations have found some support in Sunni historical sources: In his al-Saqifa wa Fadak, al-Jawhari includes a tradition to the effect that Umar and his men first threatened to set Fatima's house on fire. Then they entered the house, despite her pleas, and forced Ali and his supporters out of the house. The remainder of the earlier account in al-Imama wa al-siyasa describes that Ali was pulled out of his house by force and brought before Abu Bakr, where he paid allegiance under duress. Mu'awiya is known to have alluded to the violent arrest of Ali in a letter to him before the Battle of Siffin (657).

Modern views 
Madelung is uncertain about the use of force. Still, he notes that there is evidence (in Sunni sources) that Fatima's house was searched. According to Madelung, Ali later repeatedly said that he would have resisted (Abu Bakr) had there been forty men with him. Alternatively, Buehler suggests that the allegations of violence should be treated with caution as they reflect the political agendas of the time. In contrast, Veccia Vaglieri is of the view that the Shia allegations are based on facts, even if they have been exaggerated. Abbas writes that some well-regarded Sunni sources mention Umar's raid and Fatima's injuries.

Censorship 
Khetia believes that there are known instances where sensitive information about the incident has been censored by Sunni authors, such as the prominent jurist Abu Ubayd al-Salam, who was possibly concerned with the righteous representation of Muhammad's companions. Similar allegations have emerged against al-Tabari and al-Mas'udi, though the latter has also been accused of Shia tendencies. Along these lines, Lucas and Soufi both note the Sunni tendency to minimize and neutralize the conflicts among companions after Muhammad, particularly about the Saqifa affair, while these conflicts might have been amplified in Shia records.

Abu Bakr's regret 
Both al-Tabari and al-Mas'udi note that Abu Bakr regretted the events after Saqifa on his deathbed. In particular, al-Tabari writes that Abu Bakr wished he had "never opened Fatima's house to anything, even though they had locked it as a gesture of defiance." This appears to be a sensitive admission that has been censored by the Sunni author Abu Ubayd al-Salam in his Kitab al-amwal. It is likely that al-Tabari too has concealed parts of the admission because al-Mas'udi writes in his report that, "He [Abu Bakr] recalled that [event] in many words [at length]," even though this author also suppresses recollections of Abu Bakr. The caliph's regret is also cited by al-Ya'qubi, who sympathized with the cause of Alids. In his account, Abu Bakr wished he had "not searched the house of Fatima, daughter of the Messenger of God, or allowed men to enter it, even it was shut with the purpose of inciting war."

Death of Fatima 
Fatima died in 11/632, within six months of Muhammad's death. She was about eighteen or twenty-seven at that time according to Shia and Sunni sources, respectively. The Sunni view is that Fatima died from grief after Muhammad's death. Shia Islam, however, holds that Fatima's injuries during the raid by Umar directly caused her miscarriage and death shortly after.

Some sources report that Fatima never reconciled with Abu Bakr and Umar, partly based on a tradition to this effect in the canonical Sunni collection Sahih al-Bukhari. There are also some accounts that Abu Bakr and Umar visited Fatima on her deathbed to apologize, which Madelung considers to be self-incriminatory. As reported in the Sunni al-Imama wa al-siyasa, Fatima reminded the two visitors of Muhammad's words, "Fatima is part of me, and whoever angers her has angered me." The dying Fatima then told the two that they had indeed angered her and that she would soon take her complaint to God and His prophet, Muhammad. There are also Sunni reports that Fatima reconciled with Abu Bakr and Umar, though Madelung suggests that they were invented to address the negative implications of Fatima's anger.

Following her will, Ali buried Fatima secretly at night. As noted by al-Tabari, her dying wish was that Abu Bakr should not attend the funeral, and this request was fulfilled by Ali. Her exact burial place in Medina remains uncertain.

Reaction of Ali 
Sunni sources are nearly unanimous that Ali pledged his allegiance to Abu Bakr after Fatima's death. After her death and in the absence of popular support, Ali is said to have relinquished his claims to the caliphate for the sake of the unity of a nascent Islam, which was facing internal and external threats, according to Mavani. In particular, Jafri notes that Ali turned down proposals to forcefully pursue the caliphate, including an offer from Abu Sufyan. In reference to Abu Bakr's caliphate, Madelung writes that a poem later began to circulate among the Banu Hashim ending with, "Surely, we have been cheated in the most monstrous way." Ali forbade the poet to recite it, adding that the welfare of Islam was dearer to him than anything else. Shah-Kazemi mentions this and similar accounts in Sharḥ nahj al-balagha by the Mu'tazilite Ibn Abi'l-Hadid.

In contrast with Muhammad's lifetime, Ali is believed to have retired from public life during the caliphates of Abu Bakr, Umar, and Uthman. Anthony describes this change in Ali's attitude as a silent censure of the first three caliphs. While he reputedly advised Abu Bakr and Umar on government and religious matters, the mutual distrust and hostility of Ali with the two is well-documented, but largely downplayed or ignored in Sunni sources. Their differences were epitomized during the proceedings of the electoral council in 644 when Ali refused to be bound by the precedence of the first two caliphs. The charge that Ali was dragged to the mosque, and there he pledged to Abu Bakr under duress and threat of execution appears also in the Sunni al-Imama wa al-siyasa, which is sometimes attributed to Ibn Qutaybah but is possibly written by another Sunni author in the Abbasid era.

A common Sunni argument is that Ali would have never continued his relations with Umar had the latter organized a raid on Ali's home. A typical Shia response is that Ali gave up his rights and exercised restraint for the sake of a nascent Islam.

See also

References

Sources 

 
 
 
 
 
 

 
 
 
 
 
 
 
 
 
 
 
 
 

 
 
 
 
 
 
 
 
 
 
 
 
 
 

632
7th-century Islam
Ali
Fatimah
Shia–Sunni relations
Umar
History of Islam
History of Shia Islam